Propiedad is a 1962 Argentine film directed by Mario Soffici.

Cast
 Nelly Beltrán		
 Tato Bores		
 Graciela Borges		
 Juan Carlos Galván		
 Zelmar Gueñol		
 Carlos Gómez		
 Maurice Jouvet		
 Carmen Llambí		
 Horacio Nicolai		
 Nathán Pinzón		
 Mario Soffici

External links
 

1962 films
1960s Spanish-language films
Argentine black-and-white films
Films directed by Mario Soffici
1960s Argentine films